Robert Beck is an English actor. Amongst many guest roles, he has had regular roles in several programmes such his time as Peter Harrison in Brookside (1991–1993); Dan Thatcher in The Upper Hand (1995); Gavin Ferris in Emmerdale (1999); as Bombardier Boyd Billington in Bombshell (2006) and as Terry Appleyard in Waterloo Road (2007).  In 2008, he featured occasionally as criminal Jimmy Dockerson in Coronation Street. In 2021, he began appearing in the Channel 4 soap opera Hollyoaks as Fergus Collins.

Beck married actress Jane Danson in 2005 and they have two sons.

Filmography

References

External links
 

English male soap opera actors
Living people
Male actors from London
Year of birth missing (living people)